Hodonoc is a village in the Kamenicë municipality, eastern Kosovo.It is home to some of the greatest and most welcoming people in the county of Kamenica , there is 1 primary and middle school , a river , 2 mosques some really beautiful hills and many houses . A lot of its population live in the west because of serbian occupation in the 90’s.
A lot of wildlife aswell like : foxes , deers , boars , and rarely spotter bears .

Notes

References

Villages in Kamenica, Kosovo